Jan Sobol (born 22 May 1984) is a Czech handball player, currently playing for Dijon Bourgogne HB and the Czech national handball team.

References

External links
 EHF Profile

1984 births
Living people
Czech male handball players
Sportspeople from Karviná